Landay may refer to:

 Landay (poetry), a traditional Afghan poetic form
 Landay, Helmand, a town in Helmand Province, Afghanistan 
 Landay, Nimruz, a place in Nimruz Province, Afghanistan
 Vincent Landay, Canadian-American film producer
 William Landay (born 1963), American novelist